Simon Hilton (born 1967 near Bournemouth) is an English music video, concert and documentary director and editor and multimedia creative based in London.

Early life and career 
Hilton grew up surrounded by science and theatre, as his father was a nuclear scientist and director of the Adelphi Theatre in London. He studied classical music & theory from age 7.

In 1980, he was awarded a classical music scholarship to Canford School (studying clarinet, piano and guitar) where he took Maths, Physics and Biology A Levels and maintained strong interest and involvements in the areas of music, photography, film, art and the then nascent computer sciences.

After working in London and graduating with honours from Ravensbourne College in 1989, Hilton apprenticed his editing skills at London post-production houses 625 and Rushes.

In 1992 he began a freelance editing career, specialising in music-based content. He has to date edited over 350 music videos.

Between 1992 & 1999, his directing career also flourished at Red Star Films and at The Artists Company, directing a number of videos for Robbie Williams and other prominent EMI and Polydor artists.

He has directed videos featuring, amongst others John Lennon, Yoko Ono, Paul McCartney, George Harrison, The Beatles, Robbie Williams, Kylie Minogue, Supergrass, Delakota. William Orbit and Ether.

Editing credits include David Bowie, The Chemical Brothers, Nick Cave, Oasis, Led Zeppelin, Depeche Mode and Supergrass.

Current projects include music videos & documentaries, live concerts, concert projections, art films, website design, internet multimedia and archive restoration & development through his agency, REVL8 Ltd.

Directing credits

Music videos 
 Ed Harcourt: 'Black Feathers'
 Ed Harcourt: 'Russian Roulette'
 Supergrass: 'Diamond Hoo Ha Man' (co-director)
 The Beatles: 'Within You Without You/Tomorrow Never Knows'
 Paul McCartney: 'Chaos and Creation in the Backyard' DVD
 Supergrass: 'Supergrass is 10' DVD
 John Lennon: 'Lennon Legend' DVD
Relish: 'Rainbow Zephyr'
 Dum Dums: 'Army of Two'
 Robbie Williams & Kylie Minogue: 'Kids' (2002 Brit Award nomination - Best Video)
 David Holmes: '69 Police'
 Alice Cooper: 'Gimme'
 Robbie Williams: 'Dance with the Devil' (1st ever multichannel DVD promo)
 Precious: 'Stand Up'
 Stephen Gately: 'A New Beginning'
 Robbie Williams: 'It's Only Us' (2000 LEAF Best Music Video nomination)
 Medal: 'Porno Song'
 Robbie Williams: 'Angels' live at Manchester Arena
 Robbie Williams: 'Millennium' live at Manchester Arena
 Robbie Williams: 'Strong'
 Medal: 'Up Here For Hours'
 Delakota: '555'
 Delakota: 'C'mon Cincinnati'
 Ether: 'Best Friend'
 Satellite Beach: 'Psycho'
 Ether: 'She Could Fly'
 Iron Maiden: 'The Angel & The Gambler'
 Radiator: 'I Am'
 Ether: 'If You If Really Want To Know'
 Naimee Coleman: 'Care About You'
 Grass~Show: '1962'
 Eternal: 'Secrets'
 Planet Claire: 'Say'
 Planet Claire: '21'
 Iron Maiden: 'Man on the Edge' (Live in Israel)
 Morrissey: 'Hold Onto Your Friends'
 William Orbit: 'Strange Cargo III' longform

Music Longforms / Concerts / DVDs 
 Diamond Hoo Ha Men: 'Glange Fever' Rockumentary (30 mins) (co-director)
 Diamond Hoo Ha Men: 'Glange Fever' Reflux - The Outtakes (Parts One to Fore!) (co-director)
 Diamond Hoo Ha Men: 'Glange Fever' The Tour (9 Tracks) (co-director)
 Paul McCartney: 'Chaos and Creation at Abbey Road' (60 min concert)
 Paul McCartney: 'Creating Chaos at Abbey Road' (30 min making-of)
 Paul McCartney: 'Chaos and Creation in the Backyard' DVD
 Yoko Ono: 'Live at All Tomorrows Parties', Camber Sands
 Supergrass: 'Supergrass is 10' DVD
 John Lennon: 'Lennon Legend' DVD (20 videos & 5 extra features)
 Robbie Williams: 2 x versions of 'Rock, DJ' for website
 Robbie Williams: 19 x 'ROB TV' inserts for Slaine DVD
 Robbie Williams: 'Angels' DVD
 Robbie Williams: 'Karma Killer' – Stage projections for World Tour
 Robbie Williams: 'Kids'– Stage projections for World Tour
 William Orbit: 'Strange Cargo 3' longform (6 x videos)
 Ashley Maher: 'Pomegranate' longform (5 x videos)

Films and documentaries 
 Yoko Ono: 'IMAGINE PEACE TOWER' documentary
 Yoko Ono: 'Passages For Light' documentary
 Yoko Ono: 'Yoko Ono in Moscow/Odyssey of A Cockroach' documentary
 Diamond Hoo Ha Men: 'Glange Fever' Rockumentary (30 mins)
 John Lennon & Yoko Ono: 'War Is Over! (If You Want It)' (10 mins)
 Paul McCartney: 'Between Chaos and Creation' (30 mins)
 Paul McCartney: 'Chaos and Creation in the Backyard' (30 min TV – VH1 & Channel 4)
 Paul McCartney: 'Paul McCartney at Live 8: Onstage & Backstage'
 Yoko Ono: 'Onochord' documentary
 Yoko Ono: 'The Tate Gallery Lecture' (100 mins)
 Supergrass: 'A Home Movie' (feature length)
 Keith Urban: 'Days Go By'
 Pink Floyd: 'The Making of The Dark Side of the Moon' SACD 30th Anniversary
 Robbie Williams: 'Life Thru A Lens'
 'Gumball 3000': documentary of 1999 European Classic Car rally/race.

EPKs and miscellaneous 
 Paul McCartney "Good Evening New York City" Press Launch
 Paul McCartney / The Fireman "Electric Arguments" Press Launch
 EMI/Capitol/Virgin: Conference 2008
 EMI/Capitol/Virgin: Conference 2007
 EMI/Capitol/Virgin: Dublin Conference 2006
 Paul McCartney "Chaos and Creation in the Backyard USA EPK
 Paul McCartney "Chaos and Creation in the Backyard UK EPK
 EMI/Capitol/Virgin: New York Conference 2005
 Keith Urban "Days Go By" European EPK
 EMI/Capitol/Virgin: Global Marketing Conference Toronto 2004
 EMI/Capitol/Virgin: Global Marketing Conference Barcelona 2003
 Filippa Giordano: 'Il Rosso Amore' EPK
 Pink Floyd: 'Echoes' EPK
 Manic Street Preachers: Reading 2001 Back Projections
 EMI:Chrysalis Records: UK Retail Conference 2001
 EMI:Chrysalis Records: Barcelona Conference 2000
 Precious: Debut Album EPK
 Manic Street Preachers: V99 Stage walk-on tape
 The Beatles: Yellow Submarine EPK
 EMI International Records UK: South East Asia Conference 1999
 EMI Chrysalis: June Conference 98
 Chrysalis Records: EMI 100 Conference presentation & I.D.

Stage Screens (films made to accompany live performances) 
 Paul McCartney: 'Eleanor Rigby'
 Paul McCartney: 'I Want To Come Home'
 Paul McCartney: 'Sgt. Pepper'
 Paul McCartney: 'Back in the USSR'
 Yoko Ono: 'at the Bluecoat' - April 2008 performance
 Paul McCartney: 'Live And Let Die' & 'Get Back' - Brits 2008 performances
 Live Earth concert: 7 July 2007 - films

External links
 
 IMVDB page
 MVDBase page
 [www.linkedin.com/in/shilton007 LinkedIn page]
 REVL8 website

References

British film directors
British music video directors
1967 births
Living people
People educated at Canford School
Mass media people from Bournemouth